Di Di Hollywood is a 2010 drama film written, directed and produced by Bigas Luna. It stars Elsa Pataky, Peter Coyote, and Paul Sculfor. It was released in Spain on 15 October 2010. It was Luna's final film before his death from leukemia in 2013.

Summary
Diana Diaz (Pataky) works at a bar in Madrid; she wants to be famous, and sets off for Miami. When she arrives, she meets Robert (Hacha), and the pair head to Hollywood, willing to do anything to become famous. Once there, she meets agent Michael McLean (Coyote). He changes her name to "Di Di" and gives her false hopes of becoming famous. But she discovers he really just wants to use her  as a beard for gay actor Steve Richards (Sculfor).

Cast
 Elsa Pataky as Diana Diaz "Di Di"
 Peter Coyote as Michael Stein 
 Paul Sculfor as Steve Richards 
 Giovanna Zacaría as Nora 
 Luis Hacha as Robert 
 Flora Martínez as María 
 Jean-Marie Juan as David 
 Leonardo García as Aldo 
 Ben Temple as Richard Low 
 Ana Soriano as Madre de Diana

Production

Filming
Filming took place in Madrid, Spain; Valencia, Spain; Elche, Spain; Ciudad de la Luz; and the hospital scene was shot in Benidorm, Spain. Filming was shot from October - November 2009.

Soundtrack

"Where No Endings End" by Keren Ann (3:37)
"Time of Our Lives" by Gram Rabbit (4:06)
"Sad Song" by Au Revoir Simone (4:09)
"Loba" by Shakira (3:07)
"La Vie en rose" by Louis Armstrong (3:26)
"In My Book" by Gram Rabbit (3:25)
"Heidi's Theme" by Decoder Ring (2:37)
"Candy Flip" by Gram Rabbit (4:46)
"Azabache" by Lucas Masciano (5:48)
"Amor y lujo" by Mónica Naranjo (4:06)
"Curtain Up" by John Cacavas
"Fiera inquieta" by Nicolas Uribe
"If I Were A Boy" by Kym Mazelle (4:09)
"One Way or Another" by Blondie (3:31)

Reviews
Variety reviewed is as "the script proves unable to make Di Di’s journey interesting or credible, while the uncharismatic Pataky is unconvincing as star material."

References

External links

2010 drama films
2010 films
Films shot in Spain
Films directed by Bigas Luna
2010s Spanish-language films
Spanish drama films
2010s English-language films